Michael Archdeacon, of Combehall in Drewsteignton, Devon was an English politician who was MP for Cornwall in February 1383 and November 1390. He was the son of John Archdeacon, in turn a son of Thomas Archdeacon, and a younger brother of Warin Archdeacon.

References

English MPs February 1383
English MPs November 1390
People from the Borough of West Devon
Members of the Parliament of England (pre-1707) for Cornwall